Time Bomb is a 2006 television film starring David Arquette and Angela Bassett, by CBS Television.

Plot
During a football game in Washington, D.C., a terrorist makes a bomb threat to the DHS, stating that a bomb is in a stadium. Meanwhile, the family of DHS agent Mike Bookman (Arquette), are taken hostage. This brings out issues of suspect and trust amongst colleagues as the terrorist is suspected to be amongst them.

Cast
David Arquette as Mike Bookman
Angela Bassett as Jill Greco
Richard T. Jones as Douglas Campbell
Sabine Karsenti as Deanne Mitchell
Tara Rosling as Lynn Bookman
Simon Reynolds as Richard Zawadski
Gianpaolo Venuta as Agent Brian Goodman
Carlo Rota as Musab Hyatti
Fajer Al-Kaisi as Al-Fatwa
Lynne Adams as FBI Agent Lawton
Devon Goyo as Sean Bookman
Jayne Heitmeyer as Audio Tech Marin
Carlo Rota as Musab Hyatti

References

External links

2006 television films
2006 films
Canadian thriller television films
2006 thriller drama films
American war drama films
American psychological thriller films
Films directed by Stephen Gyllenhaal
Films scored by Louis Febre
2006 psychological thriller films
CBS network films
American thriller drama films
Canadian thriller drama films
English-language Canadian films
Canadian psychological thriller films
2006 drama films
American thriller television films
2000s American films
2000s Canadian films